Burrumbeet is a town in western Victoria, Australia. At the 2021 census, Burrumbeet and the surrounding area had a population of 249.

Lake Burrumbeet, a large but shallow eutrophic lake, is located nearby.

History
Burrumbeet Post Office opened on 1 September 1857 and closed in 1978. In August 1874, Burrumbeet railway station was opened, along with the line from Ballarat to Ararat. The station was closed to passengers in 1972, and was completely closed in December 1987.

Today
Burrumbeet has a Thoroughbred horse racing club, the Burrumbeet Park & Windermere Racing Club, which holds one race meeting a year, the Burrumbeet Cup meeting on New Year's Day.

See also
Burrumbeet railway station

References

Towns in Victoria (Australia)
1857 establishments in Australia